Zelyony is a rural locality (a settlement) and the administrative center of Beryozovskoye Rural Settlement, Buturlinovsky District, Voronezh Oblast, Russia. The population was 705 as of 2010. There are 8 streets.

Geography 
Zelyony is located 11 km southeast of Buturlinovka (the district's administrative centre) by road. Buturlinovka is the nearest rural locality.

References 

Rural localities in Buturlinovsky District